Ernest Charles Drury  (January 22, 1878 – February 17, 1968) was a farmer, politician and writer who served as the eighth premier of Ontario, from 1919 to 1923 as the head of a United Farmers of Ontario–Labour coalition government.

Family
Drury was the grandson of Richard Drury, who arrived in Crown Hill, Ontario, from Kenilworth, Warwickshire, England, in 1819.

His father, Charles Alfred Drury, continued the family farm and was a forward-looking farmer, who used new techniques and technologies. In 1882, he was president of the Agricultural and Arts Association of Ontario. He also served as reeve of Oro Township, in Simcoe County, for 13 years and was elected to the Ontario Legislature as an Ontario Liberal Party member. He served from 1882 to 1890, the last two years as Ontario's first Minister of Agriculture.

Early career
Drury was an Opposition candidate in Simcoe North in the 1917 wartime election, which was held during the Conscription Crisis of 1917, but was defeated by the Government candidate.

Premier of Ontario

Drury was a co-founder of the UFO in 1913 but did not run in the 1919 election, which returned farmer candidates as the largest bloc in the provincial legislature. Not having a leader, the UFO Members of the Legislative Assembly (MLAs) asked Drury to lead them. The UFOs 49 MLAs joined with 11 Labour members to form a coalition government. It was the first of a wave of United Farmers governments that took power in several provinces and that founded the Progressive Party of Canada. Drury was the first premier of Ontario to have been born in the province after confederation.

Drury was elected to the Legislative Assembly in Halton in 1920, after John Featherstone Ford, the sitting UFO MLA, had stepped aside.

Achievements

The Drury government had a significant impact on the Province:

 It introduced allowances for widows and children, a minimum wage for women, a mandatory weekly day of rest, broadened workmen's compensation benefits improved the support mechanisms for parents and children born out of wedlock, and standardized adoption procedures.
 Ontario Hydro saw greater expansion in the field of rural electrification and in 1921, Hydro acquired the Toronto Electric Light Company, together with various railway interests, thus making it the largest electric power system in the world.
 The Province of Ontario Savings Office was created, effectively a provincially-owned bank that was designed to lend money to farmers at a lower rate.
 It began the first major reforestation program in North America, and initiated construction of the modern highway system.
 Drury also arranged for a grant to Frederick Banting and Charles Best, at that time relatively unknown researchers, as a result of their discovery of insulin.

Temperance controversies
The government was also a strict enforcer of temperance measures, amidst mixed publicity. The newly-elected Labour MLA George Grant Halcrow was immediately convicted of violating the Ontario Temperance Act, which prevented him from receiving an expected appointment to the Cabinet. He became House Leader for the Labour Party but found himself at odds with Attorney-General William Raney over temperance by admitting, "I was an out-and-out wet in the Legislature."

When police and liquor officials were authorized to search automobiles and private yachts for illegal liquor, The Toronto Telegram observed that the only means of transportation where citizens could be free from search were "balloons and submarines". Another Act was passed which effectively prevented any movement of liquor within the Province, but it was later held not to prohibit exports to the United States.

In 1920, Reverend J. O. L. Spracklin, a Provincial Temperance enforcer, shot and killed an illicit liquor trader. The pastor, a strongly zealous and articulate personality, was acquitted of manslaughter, but the resultant publicity, generally linked with a major professed aim of Drury's administration, served to call the aim of rigorous temperance enforcement into question in the minds of many Ontarians.

Ontario Hydro
Dougall Carmichael, appointed as Minister without Portfolio, was given the responsibility of being the government representative on the Hydro-Electric Power Commission of Ontario, and specifically with keeping its chairman Adam Beck in line. At one point in 1922, Carmichael announced to the Legislature that he was quitting his position as Commissioner because Hydro "was either inefficient or dishonest". He was forced to retract the allegation of dishonesty, and continued to be a Commissioner until the following year.

In 1920, responding to a campaign to have Hydro's rates made uniform, a Legislature committee headed by John G. Lethbridge proposed a levy of $2 per  on all electricity generated in the province in order to subsidize up to 80% of construction costs on rural transmission lines (whenever there was an average of three customers per mile of line). Beck rejected the idea of a levy, but put forward his own plan (which generated great controversy). An Act that favoured Beck's view, through subsidizing up to 50% of construction costs in the rural power zone, was passed in 1921, which effectively tightened Hydro's control over public distributors and denied payments to private electricity producers.

Hydro's plans for the promotion of interurban railways were significantly scaled back after the Sutherland Commission's report on the subject recommended it in 1921, and its affairs in general were the subject of the Gregory Commission appointed in 1922.

By battling with Beck and his plans for expansion of the province's hydro-electric system, Drury also alienated industrialists and many workers.

Forest policy
The Drury government investigated the administration of forest concessions granted under the previous Hearst administration, which had been directed by its minister Howard Ferguson, and passed an Act to provide for corrective measures with regard to permits that had been improperly issued.

A particular issue with Ferguson's previous actions was that he had sold timber limits to the Shevlin-Clarke Lumber Company (headed by fellow Conservative James Arthur Mathieu) for less than half the price they would have normally fetched, and the company later paid a fine of $1.5 million for breaching the Crown Timber Act. This transaction, as well as others, were criticized in a subsequent inquiry by the Latchford-Riddell Commission, which reported:

Despite the amount of evidence gathered about the improper administration of forest lands (including Ferguson's self-professed arrogance in the matter) and the recommendations given as to how it should be improved, the industry and Ferguson launched a vigorous attack against the United Farmers. Ferguson described the Commission as "claptrap political conspiracy", accused Drury and Raney of "political knavery", and the UFO as "intellectual and political freaks who were projected into prominence by accident and who grew out of garbage". This scuttled any attempts at reform and helped to contribute to their later downfall.

Other difficulties
Many labour leaders distrusted a government dominated by farmers, feeling that they could not understand the problems of urban workers. Drury's failure to establish fair wage provisions in government contracts and his commitment to free trade that threatened the livelihood of industrial workers alienated urban workers further.

The government was also harmed by the Ontario Bond Scandal that resulted in Provincial Treasurer Peter Smith being jailed.

The government was opposed by all the major newspapers in the province, with the exception of the Toronto Star, and, despite its attempt to broaden its base, was opposed by business.

Fall from power
The government under Drury tried to be a "people's government" rather than a "class government", but in so doing, alienated the base of its support, particularly farmers. In a series of erratic events, the UFO government clashed with the uncooperative UFO organization (led by James J. Morrison throughout Drury's term) which ultimately withdrew its support.

The Drury government collapsed after it introduced bills in the Legislature that would have brought in proportional representation and a preferential ballot and Drury called an early election. The government was defeated when it ran for re-election in the 1923 provincial election, in part, due to false claims that Drury had used $100 to purchase a new coal scuttle for his personal use. In fact, the device was an old scuttle which had been retrieved from storage and polished up. Drury never responded to the false claim, however, and it contributed to opposition claims of the government's extravagance.

Later life
Drury retired from politics but later ran as a federal candidate. Unlike many other members of the UFO, he never joined either the Liberal Party of Canada or the Co-operative Commonwealth Federation.

Drury was active with the Progressive Party of Canada following the demise of his provincial government. He ran as a Progressive candidate in Simcoe North in the 1925 Canadian federal election, 1926 and 1930 federal elections but was defeated by Conservative candidates by margins of 600, 200 and 800 votes respectively.

Local government
In 1934, he was appointed sheriff and registrar of Simcoe County, a position which he held until 1959. A portrait of Drury is still displayed prominently at the local courthouse in Barrie.

Writings
He wrote for magazines such as Maclean's and also wrote two local histories of Simcoe County. He did not write his memoirs until 1966.

In June 2019, the city of Barrie published a poem of Drury’s entitled An Ode to Freedom in Canada along with interviews with his descendants on a website called Barrie Today.com.

Drury remained interested in political matters. During the debate on whether or not Canada should install American-operated nuclear-tipped Bomarc missiles in the 1960s, Drury wrote "the next government of Canada... should refuse to accept nuclear arms. The whole nuclear program of the United States is dangerous."

Recognition
In 2011, the Ontario Heritage Trust erected a marker at Drury's gravesite, as part of its Premiers' Gravesites Program.

There was a secondary school, E. C. Drury High School, which was closed and replaced by Craig Kielburger Secondary School in 2012. The provincial E. C. Drury School for the Deaf is still in operation in Milton, Ontario.

See also

 James J. Morrison#Collapse of Drury government
 William Raney#Close involvement with Ontario Temperance Act
 J. O. L. Spracklin#Prohibition controversies and events of 1920

References

Further reading

Biography

Bibliography

Other

External links
 
 
 
 
 E.C. Drury fonds, Archives of Ontario

1878 births
1968 deaths
Canadian farmers
Canadian political party founders
Leaders of the United Farmers of Ontario/Progressives
Members of the United Church of Canada
People from Simcoe County
Premiers of Ontario
United Farmers of Ontario MLAs